Wiggle is the fifth studio album by the Chicago-based punk rock band Screeching Weasel. Initially planned for release in November 1992, the album was finally released on CD, vinyl and cassette on January 15, 1993 through Lookout Records. Due to a "cymbal hissing" in the original vinyl version, the album was remixed and re-released soon afterwards.

After the band's popularity had grown with their previous album My Brain Hurts, the group felt pressured with the follow-up album. While most of Wiggle is in a similar vein to their previous album, some songs saw the band experimenting with new wave and a few featured a more hardcore-influenced sound reminiscent of the group's earlier material. In retrospect, vocalist Ben Weasel has voiced dissatisfaction with the album, mainly the songs that were chosen for it. However, he considers the band's performance and the album's production better than My Brain Hurts.

The album was remastered and reissued by Asian Man Records in 2005 shortly after the band had removed its catalog from Lookout due to unpaid royalties and a vinyl version was released by Recess Records in 2009.

Background
Shortly after the recording of My Brain Hurts, bassist Dave Naked was fired from the band at the insistence of guitarist Dan Vapid and was initially replaced by Scott "Gub" Conway, who toured with the band in support of the album. Conway himself was replaced after the tour by Vindictives bassist Johnny Personality, who vocalist Ben Weasel considered an “outstanding bass player". Weasel had briefly played with The Vindictives in 1990 on their first EP and Personality auditioned for Weasel and John Jughead's band the Gore Gore Girls during Screeching Weasel's brief break-up the same year. In February 1992, the band went to engineer Steve Albini's house in Chicago to record demos for their next album, with Albini serving as engineer and Naked Raygun drummer Eric Spicer producing. Two of the songs from the session, "Crying in My Beer" and "Jeannie's Got a Problem with Her Uterus", were re-recorded for Wiggle, while "Going Home" was released on a split EP with the Pink Lincolns (and later released on the CD version of the album) and "Celena" was featured on the compilation album It's a Punk Thing, You Wouldn't Understand.

Recording
In June 1992, the band went to Sonic Iguana Studios in Lafayette, Indiana to record Wiggle with studio owner Mass Giorgini producing. Giorgini would go on to produce several of the band's later albums and also served as their bassist from 1996 to 2001. The band recorded several songs during the sessions, including the non-album single "Radio Blast" and its b-side "The Girl Next Door", a re-working of the song "Cindy's on Methadone" titled "Shirley's on Methadone" for a film called Shirley Pimple (which was never released as the director ended up in prison) and a cover of the song "Achtung" by the band The Authorities for a tribute album (which was also never released). Another song from the session, "Amy Saw Me Looking at Her Boobs", originated as a composition by Joe King (Joe Queer) of The Queers from 1990 that Weasel finished. The song was later re-worked by The Queers as "Fuck the World" on their album Love Songs for the Retarded, which Screeching Weasel also recorded a version of. Weasel later called the sessions for the album an "enormous pain in the ass" due to the long recording process and that he "wasn't singing like [him]self", saying his vocals on the album were "horrible." He also stated that he was having relationship problems with his girlfriend at the time of the recording, which resulted in "fucking up [his] head" and having "no idea what should go on the album and what shouldn't."

Track listing

Personnel
 Ben Weasel – lead vocals
 John Jughead – lead guitar
 Danny Vapid – rhythm guitar, backing vocals, bass on "Teenage Slumber Party"
 Johnny Personality – bass
 Dan Panic – drums

Additional performers
 Doug Ward – rhythm guitar on "Teenage Slumber Party"
 Brian Vermin – drums on "Teenage Slumber Party"

Production
 Mass Giorgini – producer, engineer
 Todd Barrett – album layout
 Martin Sorrondeguy; Dan Mueller – photography
 Eric Spicer – producer on "Going Home"
 Steve Albini – engineer on "Going Home"

References

Screeching Weasel albums
1993 albums
Lookout! Records albums
Asian Man Records albums